The 1931 World Table Tennis Championships women's singles was the fifth edition of the women's singles championship.
Mária Mednyánszky defeated Mona Müller-Rüster in the final by three sets to one, to secure a fifth consecutive title.

Draw

Finals

See also
List of World Table Tennis Championships medalists

References

-
-